Dhanni is a cattle breed originating in the Punjab region of Pakistan and India, being mainly found in Attock, Chakwal, Fatehjang and tehsil Kot Fateh Khan, though it is used in other parts of the Indian subcontinent.

Description
Dhanni is a medium size light draught breed of cattle. It is characterized with a straight back bearing a big hump, a small face, and short-alerted ears. It is found in different color ranges with different spots that can be either black, brown, or red. It has a long tail ending with white switch. Bulls of this breed are known to be having great agility. A male weighs around 400 kg while a female weighs 300 kg. It is mainly a draught breed and frequently seen racing in locally popular bull cart races. A racing bull becomes very precious and sometimes may be sold at five times the price of a regular bull. 

The milk yield of females are around 1,000 - 1,200 litres.

Color patterns
Dhanni bull have different names according to it color patterns:
 White coat with black spots (Chitta Burga)
 Black coat with white sports (Kala Burga)
 White mottles with brown and black patches (Nuqra)
 Red coat with white spots (Ratta Burga)

References

Livestock in Punjab
Cattle breeds originating in India
Cattle breeds originating in Pakistan
Fauna of Pakistan